K. Rajaram (26 August 1926 – 8 February 2008) was an Indian politician of the Dravida Munnetra Kazhagam (DMK) and later, All India Anna Dravida Munnetra Kazhagam (AIADMK) and Member of the Legislative Assembly of Tamil Nadu. He served as the Speaker of the Tamil Nadu Legislative Assembly from 1980 to 1985.

Rajaram rose to prominence in 1962 when he defeated C. R. Narasimhan, son of C. Rajagopalachari while contesting from Krishnagiri as a candidate of the Dravida Munnetra Kazhagam. He was elected to the Tamil Nadu Legislative Assembly from Salem II constituency in 1971 as a DMK candidate and from the Panamarathupatti constituency in 1980,84 and 91 as an ADMK candidate. He served as the Minister for Housing and Backward Classes during 1971–73 and as the Minister for Labour during 1973–76 in the M. Karunanidhi cabinet. He was the Minister for Industries during 1985–89 in the M. G. Ramachandran cabinet and the Minister for Food during 1991–92 in the J. Jayalalitha cabinet. He also served as a Member of Lok Sabha from Krishnagiri during 1962–67 and from Salem during 1967–71.

Literary works

Books

Notes

External links
K. Rajaram's obituary

1926 births
2008 deaths
Speakers of the Tamil Nadu Legislative Assembly
India MPs 1962–1967
India MPs 1967–1970
Lok Sabha members from Tamil Nadu
People from Krishnagiri district
People from Salem district
Tamil Nadu MLAs 1991–1996
Tamil Nadu MLAs 1985–1989
All India Anna Dravida Munnetra Kazhagam politicians